Eois quadrilatera is a moth in the family Geometridae first described by Paul Dognin in 1895. It is found in Ecuador.

References

External links

Moths described in 1895
Eois
Moths of South America